Bernd Reuther (born 1 May 1971) is a German politician of the Free Democratic Party (FDP) who has been serving as a member of the Bundestag from the state of North Rhine-Westphalia since 2017.

Early life and education 
After graduating from high school in 1990, Reuther completed his military service with the 110 Supply Battalion in Rheine and subsequently studied social sciences at University of Duisburg until 1998.

Early career 
Reuther then worked for a year as a research assistant to Minister of State Werner Hoyer and later as chief of staff to Günter Rexrodt at his parliamentary office in Berlin. From 2003 to 2006, Reuther served as deputy government spokesman of the state government of Saxony-Anhalt under Minister-President Wolfgang Böhmer.

From 2006 until 2009, Reuther was an Associate Director at Hill+Knowlton Strategies in Berlin. In 2009, he first became department head at Duisburger Hafen AG and two years later at Hochtief in Essen. He held this position until he moved to the German Bundestag in 2017.

Political career 
Reuther joined the FDP in 1990. He became a member of the Bundestag in the 2017 German federal election. In parliament, he is a member of the Committee on Transport and Digital Infrastructure. In addition to his committee assignments, he is part of the German-Brazilian Parliamentary Friendship Group.

Other activities 
 Deutsche Bahn, Member of the Supervisory Board (since 2022)
 Federal Network Agency for Electricity, Gas, Telecommunications, Posts and Railway (BNetzA), Alternate Member of the Rail Infrastructure Advisory Council (since 2022)

References

External links 

  
 Bundestag biography 
 

 

 

1971 births
Living people
Members of the Bundestag for North Rhine-Westphalia
Members of the Bundestag 2017–2021
Members of the Bundestag 2021–2025
Members of the Bundestag for the Free Democratic Party (Germany)